The 1962 West Derbyshire by-election was held on 6 June 1962 after the incumbent Conservative MP, Edward Wakefield, was appointed as Commissioner for Malta.  It was retained by the Conservative candidate Aidan Crawley.

It is the largest loss of share of the vote suffered by the Conservative candidate, when the Conservative has still managed to retain the seat.

Previous election

References

By-elections to the Parliament of the United Kingdom in Derbyshire constituencies
1962 elections in the United Kingdom
1962 in England
1960s in Derbyshire